Rose on the Heath (German: Heidenröschen) is a 1916 German silent drama film directed by Franz Hofer and starring Lya Ley and Fritz Achterberg.

Cast
 Lya Ley as Röschen 
 Fritz Achterberg as Graf von Brödersdorf
 Andreas Van Horn as Röschens Onkel, der Kantor
 Franz Hofer

References

Bibliography
 Bock, Hans-Michael & Bergfelder, Tim. The Concise CineGraph. Encyclopedia of German Cinema. Berghahn Books, 2009.

External links

1916 films
1916 drama films
German drama films
Films of the German Empire
German silent feature films
Films directed by Franz Hofer
German black-and-white films
Silent drama films
1910s German films